The Smart Lighting Engineering Research Center (Smart Lighting ERC) focuses on developing solid-state lighting systems with advanced functionality, with an emphasis on industry outreach to facilitate commercialization.

Partnership
The center is an NSF Gen-3 ERC formed in 2008, and is a partnership between lead university Rensselaer Polytechnic Institute (RPI), two core partner universities—Boston University (BU) and the University of New Mexico (UNM)—and three other outreach universities—Howard University, Morgan State University (MSU), and the Rose-Hulman Institute of Technology (RHIT).  Funding comes from the National Science Foundation (NSF), New York Empire State Development's Division of Science, Technology and Innovation (NYSTAR), and industrial partners.

In the words of Director Robert F. Karlicek Jr, the Smart Lighting ERC seeks to contribute to the creation of "smart lighting systems that think." A primary goal of Gen-3 ERCs is the global commercialization of academic research.

References

External links
ERC Association
Smart Lighting ERC
Smart Light Bulb Info

Rensselaer Polytechnic Institute
National Science Foundation